Patricia Appiagyei (born 28 November 1956) is a Ghanaian politician, one-time Deputy Ashanti Regional Minister and the first female Mayor of Kumasi Metropolitan Assembly. She is  the Member of Parliament (MP) in the Seventh Parliament of the Fourth Republic of Ghana and the 8th Parliament of the Fourth Republic of Ghana, representing  Asokwa Constituency. She is a member of the New Patriotic Party in Ghana.

Early life and education 
Appiagyei was born on 28 November 1956 in Kumasi and hails from Konongo/Asawase-Kumasi, in the Ashanti Region of Ghana. She had her secondary education at the St Louis Senior Secondary in Kumasi and proceeded to Kwame Nkrumah University of Science and Technology, where she studied BA Social Science Economics/Law in 1980.She further did her Post graduate diploma- Development Economics in 1988.

Career 
Appiagyei previously worked with City Investments Company Limited as the executive director of Marketing from 1995 to 2010. She was the former Mayor of Kumasi.

Politics 
Appiagyei was a Deputy Minister for Ashanti region from 2001 to 2005 and was shortly appointed a Deputy Ashanti Regional Minister in 2005. From 2005 to 2009 she served as the Municipal Chief Executive for Kumasi. She is currently the Member of Parliament (MP) for Asokwa Constituency after beating former deputy Local Government minister, Maxwell Kofi Jumah, to win the New Patriotic Party (NPP) primary election and subsequently won the parliamentary seat during the 2016 Ghanaian general elections. She won the 2020 general election to represent her constituents in the 8th Parliament of the Fourth Republic of Ghana.

In 2017, she was appointed by Nana Akufo-Addo and approved by parliament to serve as the deputy minister for Environment, Science and Technology and Innovation. She is a board member for the Nuclear Power Ghana.

Committees 
Appiagyei is a member of the Lands and Forestry Commoittee and also a member of the Appointments Committee.

Personal life 
Appiagyei is the second wife of Dr K. K. Sarpong, a former CEO of Kotoko FC and Ghana National Petroleum Corporation, and has three children. She is a practicing Christian.

Philanthropy 
In July 2021, she paid visits to some areas in Kumasi including Old Asokwa, Kaase, Asokwa Extension, Atonsu and Agogo which got flooded after a two-day downpour. She assured the people affected of a new market place. She also visited the New Bethel Presbyterian Primary and JHS.

References 

Living people
New Patriotic Party politicians
Kwame Nkrumah University of Science and Technology alumni
21st-century Ghanaian women politicians
1956 births
Ghanaian MPs 2017–2021
Ghanaian MPs 2013–2017
Government ministers of Ghana
Mayors of Kumasi
Ghanaian MPs 2021–2025